Neurexin-3-alpha is a protein that in humans is encoded by the NRXN3 gene.

Neurexins are a family of proteins that function in the vertebrate nervous system as cell adhesion molecules and receptors. They are encoded by several unlinked genes of which two, NRXN1 and NRXN3, are among the largest known human genes. Three of the genes (NRXN1-3) utilize two alternate promoters and include numerous alternatively spliced exons to generate thousands of distinct mRNA transcripts and protein isoforms. The majority of transcripts are  produced from the upstream promoter and encode alpha-neurexin isoforms; a much smaller number of transcripts are produced from the downstream promoter and encode beta-neurexin isoforms. The alpha-neurexins contain epidermal growth factor-like (EGF-like) sequences and laminin G domains, and have been shown to interact with neurexophilins. The beta-neurexins lack EGF-like sequences and contain fewer laminin G domains than alpha-neurexins. NRXN3 is thought to be involved in synaptic plasticity, and polymorphisms in NRXN3 have been linked to genetic predisposition towards a number of conditions such as alcohol or drug addiction, or obesity.

References

Further reading